More Golden Hits is a 1970 greatest hits album by American rock band the Turtles. It was released on White Whale Records.

Track listing

Side 1
 "We Ain't Gonna Party No More" (Howard Kaylan) -- 4:54 (from White Whale single 341)
 "Story of Rock & Roll" (Harry Nilsson) -- 2:40 (from White Whale single 273)
 "You Showed Me" (Gene Clark, Jim McGuinn) -- 3:05 (from The Turtles Present the Battle of the Bands)
 "Sound Asleep" (Kaylan, Mark Volman) -- 2:30 (from White Whale single 264)
 "You Don't Have to Walk in the Rain" (Kaylan, Al Nichol, Jim Pons, John Seiter, Volman) -- 2:27 (from Turtle Soup)
 "Who Would Ever Think that I Would Marry Margaret" (Ralph Dino, John Sembello) -- 2:02 (from White Whale single 341)

Side 2
 "She's My Girl" (Gary Bonner, Alan Gordon) -- 2:32 (from White Whale single 260)
 "Elenore" (Johnny Barbata, Kaylan, Al Nichol, Pons, Volman) -- 2:49 (from The Turtles Present the Battle of the Bands)
 "Lady-O" (Judee Sill) -- 4:10 (from White Whale single 334)
 "Hot Little Hands" (Kaylan, Nichol, Pons, Seiter, Volman) -- 2:59 (from Turtle Soup)
 "Love in the City" (Kaylan, Nichol, Pons, Seiter, Volman) -- 2:03 (the reel-to-reel version is 3:40) (from Turtle Soup)
 "Cat in the Window" (Bonner, Gordon) -- 1:41 (non-single LP debut)

1970 greatest hits albums
The Turtles albums
White Whale Records compilation albums